The Fair Expo Center is a convention center located in Miami, Florida, adjacent to the campus of Florida International University.  It has been built in stages since 1952.  The center's main entrance features four meeting rooms totaling  of space.

Arnold Hall
The flagship facility of the complex is the  Arnold Hall, which seats up to 7,460 for many events, including concerts, sporting events, banquets, etc.  It's also used for trade shows.  There is also a box office, an in-house restaurant, a state-of-the-art sound system, a meeting room seating up to 125, and public restrooms.

Edwards Hall
Edwards Hall features  of unobstructed space and seats up to 5,083 fans. It is air-conditioned and also contains a sound system. It is used for trade shows, conventions, and sporting events.

Sunshine Pavilion
The Sunshine Pavilion was built in 2000 and can hold up to 6,920. It is used for trade shows, meetings and other events.

Goode Building
The Goode Building contains two meeting rooms totaling .

FairExpo Center
The FairExpo Center is the site of the annual Miami-Dade County Fair & Exposition, and is also used for recreational events.  In 1992 it housed 3,000 National Guard troops following Hurricane Andrew.  It even processed Cuban refugees during the Mariel boatlift.

External links
Official site

Convention centers in Florida
Indoor arenas in Florida
Buildings and structures in Miami
Tourist attractions in Miami
Sports venues in Miami